Pusa was a Czech pop-rock band formed in the mid-1990s by Lucie members David Koller and Marek Minárik, together with Lenka Dusilová, and included a number of rotating session musicians.

History
Pusa, formed in the mid-1990s by Lucie rockers David Koller and Marek Minárik, together with rising star Lenka Dusilová, released their eponymous debut album in 1996. A second album was supposed to be released in 1998, but as Koller and Minárik were busy with their main project, Lucie, Dusilová disbanded the group. They met again in 2000 and supported Dusilová in the recording of her first solo album, which included, among others, three songs from the originally planned second Pusa album.

Dusilová has since led a successful solo career, while Koller formed Kollerband, which also included Minárik and Krejčoves. Both Dusilová and Koller still include several Pusa songs in their respective repertoires.

Band members
 Lenka Dusilová – vocals, guitar
 David Koller – drums, keyboards, vocals
 Marek Minárik – bass, udu
 Petr Novák – guitar, saxophone
 Marek Zelený – guitar
 Oldřich Krejčoves – guitar

Discography
 Pusa (1996)

References

External links
 Lenka Dusilová official website
 David Koller official website

Czech rock music groups
Czech pop music groups